Bobby Hogg (born 4 April 1947) is a former soccer player who represented Australia during the 1970s.

Playing career

Club career
After short stints at Hibernian and Motherwell he joined Stenhousemuir.

After 55 matches with Stenhousemuir, Hogg played club football for St. George-Budapest and Auburn in the New South Wales State League.

International career
In 1972 and 1973 Hogg made a total of 17 appearances for Australia, including 13 full international matches.

References

1947 births
Living people
Australia international soccer players
Australian soccer players
Stenhousemuir F.C. players
Hibernian F.C. players
Motherwell F.C. players
St. George Saints players
Scottish Football League players
Sauchie F.C. players
Scottish emigrants to Australia
Association football midfielders